Fort Hare was an 1835 British-built fort on a rocky outcrop at the foothills of the Amatola Mountains; close to the present day town of Alice, Eastern Cape in South Africa.

History

Originally, Fort Hare was a British fort in the wars between the British troops and the Xhosa of the 19th century.

A British fort, Fort Glamorgan, was built on the West Bank of East London in 1837, and annexed to the Cape Colony that same year. This fort is one of a series of forts the British built, that include Fort Murray, Fort White, Fort Cox, Fort Hare and Fort Willshire, in the border area that became known as British Kaffraria.

On 29 December 1850, during the Eighth Frontier War with the Xhosas, some 220 British troops were forced to retreat to Fort Hare after an unsuccessful attempt to relieve Sir Harry Smith, besieged at Fort Cox.

Today
Some of the ruins of the fort are still visible today, as well as graves of some of the British soldiers who died while on duty there. Missionary activity (James Stewart) led to the creation of a school for missionaries from which at the beginning of the 20th century the University of Fort Hare resulted. In accord with its Christian principles, fees were low and heavily subsidised.

See also

 List of Castles and Fortifications in South Africa

References

Hare
Raymond Mhlaba Local Municipality